Lokkhi Terra is a London-based world music collective. Their music combines Bangladeshi folk tunes with Afrobeat and Cuban rumba. Established by pianist Kishon Khan, the band played its first gig at London's Queen Elizabeth Hall in 2006. They have performed at numerous venues since then, including WOMAD, Ronnie Scott's, Barbican Centre, and the opening ceremony of the South Asian Games.

Besides Khan, band members are Justin Thurgur on trombone, Graeme Flowers on trumpet, Phil Dawson on guitar, Tansay Omar on drums, Jimmy Martinez/Patrick Zambonin on bass, Javier Camilo on bongos/vocals, Hassan Mohyeddin on tabla and vocalists Sohini Alam, Aanon Siddiqua, and Aneire Khan. Their albums also feature additional artists including Nazrul Islam on dhol, Pandit Dinesh on tabla, Haider Rahman on bansuri, and Finn Peters on flute.

Lokkhi Terra has released two albums to date: No Visa Required and Che Guava's Rickshaw Diaries. In a review of the second album, the world music magazine Songlines wrote: "this good-natured London-based collective are now widely acknowledged as an international force to be reckoned with". Lokkhi Terra also featured on the compilation albums, London's Calling and A Beginner's Guide to India.

References

British world music groups
Musical groups established in 2006